Art Uytendaal (Adrianus Uytendaal) is an Australian equestrian. Uytendaal was born in Holland in 1931 and immigrated to Australia in January, 1956. He was one of seventeen living children, coming from an equestrian family in Breda, Holland. Because he was made professional in his homeland, he decided to spend two years in Australia as an assisted migrant, returning as an amateur,  but ended up staying for a lifetime. He was one of the first riders to use the 'European' style in Australia and introduced dressage as the basis of show jumping.

From 1956 to 1990 Art's list of wins numbered into the thousands in Australia.  He was the first sponsored rider in the country -Kevin Dennis Show Jumping Team and also Johnny Walker Whisky.  The list of wins includes three Australian Show Jumping Championships, Victorian Championships, Showjumper of the Year awards, and many Puissance records.

Some of his well-known horses, that he made or rode were Solo, Bencubbin, Donald, Madison Square, Powder, Trafalgar Square, Leal, Chatter, Gentleman, Brahmin, Tongala, Jamaica Inn, Mr. Kevin, Mr. Dennis, Wanganella, Autograph, Koyuna, Dixieland, Johnny Walker Whisky, Mr. Ed, Duell Bug, Duell Roy and Man of Gold (who competed for Japan at the Sydney Olympics.)

He was the first to jump 1 m 93 cm (6' 4") in a Puissance in Australia and in 1969 he jumped  2 m 17 cm (7' 1½") on Chatter, a record he held for many years until the rules were changed and the wall could include hay bales in front of it.

He would have qualified to ride at five Olympic Games, but being professional he was ineligible. Two of his horses, Mr. Dennis finished 5th at the Montreal Olympics ridden by Guy Creighton, and Autograph ridden by Geoff McVean finished 4th at the alternate Olympics in Rotterdam.   His first wife Marianne Uytendaal (later Gilchrist) was also an accomplished rider representing Australia on numerous occasions.  In 1976 he took two young horses to the UK - Tongala and Jamaica Inn where they both won and placed in shows, qualifying for the Horse of the Year Show, but unfortunately Art was injured and returned home.

He was the Australian coach of the World Eventing Championships in Gawler, South Australia, nominated coach for the ill-fated Moscow Olympics and also Los Angeles Olympics.

References

Australian male equestrians
Living people
1931 births